Ballad for Americans and Other American Ballads is an album by American folk singer Odetta, first released in 1960. It is now out of print.

Background
The title song was written by Earl Robinson who had been blacklisted during the Red Scare in the US. Allmusic states: "Odetta's rendition has a vitality and immediacy that puts it squarely in the thick of 1960, in the middle of the civil rights movement's heyday, at a time when Paul Robeson, because of age and infirmity, and years of fighting the government's efforts to silence him, was in eclipse as an artist."

Ballad For Americans and Other American Ballads was re-released on CD along with Odetta at Carnegie Hall on the Italian label Universe. It is difficult to locate as an import.

Reception

In his review for Allmusic, critic Bruce Eder wrote the album was Odetta's "most ambitious album up to this point in time—and for some years to come." He singled out "Pastures of Plenty," as one of the best tracks, calling it "a rendition so ominous and provocative that it rates with the best this reviewer has ever heard (which are Guthrie's own and Dylan's early-'60s officially unreleased version)."

Track listing 
 "Ballad for Americans" (Earl Robinson) – 11:44
 "This Land" (Woody Guthrie) – 2:20
 "On Top of Old Smokey" (Traditional) – 3:02
 "Hush Little Baby" (Traditional) – 1:32
 "Dark as a Dungeon" (Merle Travis) – 4:21
 "Great Historical Bum" (Guthrie) – 1:58
 "Payday at Coal Creek" (Traditional) – 3:30
 "Going Home" (Traditional) – 2:42
 "Pastures of Plenty" (Woody Guthrie) 4:02

Personnel 
 Odetta – vocals, guitar
 Bill Lee – bass
 Fred Hellerman – guitar
 Robert De Cormier – choral arranger, conductor

References 

1960 albums
Odetta albums
Vanguard Records albums
Albums arranged by Robert De Cormier
Albums conducted by Robert De Cormier